Sandra Volk (born 27 October 1985) is a Slovenian retired tennis player. On 4 December 1995, Volk reached her best singles ranking of world number 416. On 12 September 1994, she peaked at world number 305 in the doubles rankings.

Volk played one doubles rubber for Slovenia in the Fed Cup. Partnering Tina Križan, she lost to Li Ting and Sun Tiantian in the 2005 Fed Cup World Group II Play-offs.

ITF finals (0–2)

Doubles (0–2)

Fed Cup participation

Doubles

References

External links 
 
 
 

1985 births
Living people
Slovenian female tennis players